Toby is a fictional anthropomorphic brown square tram engine in The Railway Series by the Reverend Wilbert Vere Awdry and his son, Christopher; he also appears in the television series adaptation Thomas & Friends. He is currently set to also appear in its reboot, Thomas & Friends: All Engines Go. Toby, a tram engine with cowcatchers and sideplates, carries the North Western Railway running number seven and works on the same Ffarquhar Branch Line as Thomas the Tank Engine.

Toby first appeared in the seventh book in The Railway Series, Toby the Tram Engine in 1952, and appeared in several subsequent books. The second book focused on Toby was the sixth of Christopher Awdry's books, Toby, Trucks and Trouble.

Prototype and back-story

Toby is based on a J70 tram engine from the Great Eastern Railway (GER Class C53). His cowcatchers and sideplates allow him to run on roadside tramways, which other engines are not allowed to do for safety reasons. J70s were used for light duties, such as branch line work and dock shunting.

Many J70s could be found working on the Wisbech and Upwell Tramway in East Anglia only 28 miles (46 km) from Rev. W. Awdry's parish at Elsworth in Cambridgeshire in the same diocese.  Rev. W. Awdry wrote about Toby the Tram Engine in 1952, shortly before he was transferred to Emneth parish. The Tramway ran from Wisbech, through Emneth – the next station on the line – then through Outwell and Upwell. This area and its line was well known to Rev. W. Awdry who often visited Ely nearby. The Tramway was primarily used for the transportation of fruit and other farm produce to the main line at Wisbech. The line closed to passengers in 1927, but freight services continued until lorries and road transport boomed in the 1950s. In 1952, the steam tram engines were replaced by diesel Drewry Shunters (the BR Class 04). Inspiration for Toby came from the Awdrys watching a J70 – probably 68221, one of three J70s built in 1914 (as GER 127) – at Great Yarmouth in 1951. Further inspiration was drawn soon after when the Rev. 'Teddy' Boston, then curate at Wisbech, arranged for Awdry to ride on the footplate of one of the last surviving steam tram engines on the Tramway. Fascinated by the unusual engines, Awdry sought a way to incorporate them in the stories. Research by Awdry's brother, George, revealed that tramway regulations required the fitting of cowcatchers and sideplates for railway locomotives running on tracks alongside roads, and the story "Thomas in Trouble" (published in 1952, the year steam trams were replaced) evolved to provide a reason for Toby being summoned to Sodor. The story includes a description of Toby's final journeys on the line:

This was a common occurrence during the closing of real railway lines; demand decreased to an unprofitable amount, but services were often full for the last workings of steam.
Christopher Awdry has said that Toby is his favourite character, partly because he was there when his father received the inspiration to create him, but also because as a child he had travelled in the cab of two J70s.

Rev. W, Awdry served as parish priest in two parishes in Cambridgeshire, the county associated with Toby the Tram Engine. First, he was Rector of Elsworth with Knapwell from 1946 to 1953, then he was Vicar of Emneth from 1953 until 1965 when he retired from full-time ministry and moved to Stroud, Gloucestershire.

On Awdry's model railway, Toby was represented by a Y6, an 0-4-0 locomotive similar to but smaller than the J70 and better suited to the 4-wheel motor bogie available to power the model. In 1961, Awdry wrote an article for Railway Modeller magazine on the construction of this locomotive.

The Railway Series
Toby is introduced in the seventh book in The Railway Series. The first story, Toby and the Stout Gentleman, describes the closure of Toby's branch line due to the lack of passengers and freight. Shortly before the line was going to close, a "stout gentleman" arrived on a holiday with his family; the children rode on Toby every day for a fortnight and the stout gentleman gave Toby's crew a present. The day after the Tramway closed, ironically after an overcrowded final journey by Toby and Henrietta, a letter arrived from the stout gentleman which was to give Toby a reprieve.

In Thomas in Trouble, Thomas encounters an officious policeman, who says that, when running from the quarry, along public roads, engines who have the right to go on public roads must be fitted with cowcatchers and sideplates for safety to prevent people and animals from getting killed if they should have the right to stray onto the line. The Fat Controller, urgently needing to rectify this, is discussing the fitting of these, when Thomas remarks that "everyone will laugh...they'll say I look like a tram". The Fat Controller (the "stout gentleman") remembers Toby immediately and arranges for him to come to Sodor. Toby arrives with his coach, Henrietta, and becomes a friend of Thomas after Toby rings his bell and frightens the policeman.

In Dirty Objects, James makes fun of Toby's "shabby" appearance. James later has an accident with tar wagons. Toby and Percy help to clear up the mess and Toby is rewarded with a new coat of paint. His chosen livery of chocolate brown with blue sideplates replicates that which he would have worn on the GER.

Toby has small water tanks, meaning he is unsuitable for long-distance work. In Double Header (in The Eight Famous Engines), Toby uses the Main Line to travel to the Works for servicing. Stopping at a water tower to refill his tanks, he is urged on to the next station by a new Signalman who didn't understand Toby's small tanks. Toby tries to hurry to the next station, but uses up the water and runs out of steam, leaving him marooned on the mainline, far away from the next station. Toby is pushed by James to the station, where some boys misunderstand the situation and suggest that James was unable to pull the Express, and Toby was needed to double-head the train.

In Tramway Engines, Toby tried to mentor a young diesel named Mavis to work at the quarry. However, Mavis was stubborn and after not listening to Toby, got stuck on a level crossing and halted traffic. This led her to get stuck in the yard shunting trucks. She told the trucks to bump her at the level crossing so she could get out of the quarry without it seeming her fault. However, Toby was the next engine to take the trucks. The trucks carried out their plan and Toby was left on a wrecked bridge dangling over a raging river. Mavis saved Toby and the trucks and they became friends. Toby arranged for Mavis to be allowed to take the trucks where ever she wanted. 

Toby is also associated with the coach Victoria, who forms the "vintage train" with Henrietta that takes workers to and from the quarry.

The television series

Thomas and Friends

Toby first appeared in the twenty-first episode of the first season of the TV show and was one of the central characters. Toby the Tram Engine has his own song, of the same name, which is based upon his theme composed by Mike O'Donnell and Junior Campbell. This theme was originally going to be the show's theme song before the more well-known intro was decided on. Toby was originally depicted as a wise, brave and kind old engine, often giving advice to younger engines like Thomas, Percy and Mavis. Due to his experience and wisdom Toby rarely ever had accidents or derailments, and almost never got into trouble with Sir Topham Hatt.

Toby's backstory was adapted from the books and stayed accurate to what was written by Rev. W. Awdry. Toby's line, instead of being in East Anglia, was in Sodor. The line was reopened in the fifth season, which was the season in which the Railway Series stories were no longer adapted. In the same season, Toby investigates a dam during a stormy day because it is the only thing preventing a village from flooding. Toby runs back over a wooden bridge to alert everyone that the dam will break but it is too late. The dam breaks as Toby is on the bridge and Toby gets swept down the river. Percy and Harold chase after him and save him. The three are congratulated by the village. Later in the season, Toby discovers a castle and a mine with the Fat Controller. Toby is worried that the mine is haunted after hearing rumors about a ghost steam engine called "The Old Warrior". However it turns out the Old Warrior is just a nickname for a brave steam engine named Bertram. 

In the sixth and seventh season, Toby helps people with their struggles. In the episode "Toby had a Little Lamb", Toby must help Farmer McColl during a blizzard since his sheep have started to give birth. Toby and Henrietta need to get a vet for Farmer McColl in time. In the seventh season episode "Toby's Windmill", Toby accidentally damages the flour sacks in the trucks. To make matters worse, the windmill is struck by lightning. Toby feels sorry for the miller and is determined to fix his windmill. He uses a fallen tree from the storm to be cut up for timber for the windmill. The old windmill is restored and nicknamed "Toby's Windmill".
 
Starting from the eighth season and later carrying on into the animated half of the series, Toby has been feeling more insecure with the world around him as he is an old engine. He commonly worries and is not on the same page as the younger engines, like Percy, who feel more rough and ready.

After gradually appearing less and less in the show, Toby was dropped from the main cast in the twenty-second season as part of the attempt to bring the Steam Team's gender balance to a near 50/50 split. However, he was not dropped entirely, being the focus of subsequent episodes in following series and appearing in the updated roll call. Compared to both Edward and Henry (who were also dropped), Toby has had more consistent supporting roles and some leading roles than both of them.

All Engines Go
Toby is currently set to appear in the 2021 reboot's second season. His updated design has only been shown so far in a Japanese book called the Thomas the Tank Engine Character Encyclopedia.

Thomas and the Magic Railroad
In the 2000 film Thomas and the Magic Railroad, Toby is first seen reminding the other engines that they must not let Diesel 10 push them around. Later, after Diesel 10 overhears Thomas and Percy's conversation about how Mr. Conductor travels to Sodor, Toby manages to stall Diesel 10 by ringing his bell. Diesel 10 tries to attack Toby with his claw, but instead fails and brings a shed down onto himself as well as his cronies.

Colm Feore provided the voice of Toby in the film, portraying the character with an old English dialect.

Henrietta
Henrietta is Toby's faithful coach, based on the Wisbech and Upwell Tramway non-articulated GER four-wheeled coach. She worked with Toby on their old railway, and when that line closed Toby could not bear to leave her behind. The stationmaster had wanted to turn her into a henhouse, but The Fat Controller agreed that "that would never do." The two are inseparable, and whenever they are apart they worry about each other:

Henrietta carries passengers and is used to bring quarry workers to and from work. In "The Fat Controller's Engines" (The Eight Famous Engines), she is used as the Fat Controller's private coach when the locomotives take a trip to The Other Railway.

Henrietta was the only named character not to be illustrated with a face in The Railway Series until book 41 of the series, Thomas and Victoria. In this book, Henrietta is depicted with a small rectangular face where a window on the end doors would be. It was the same colour as her cabin, like the other coaches. She wouldn't be depicted with a visible face in the television series until the eighteenth season. Her face in this series is larger than in the Railway Series, and it completely replaces the door on one end, as well as the immediately adjoining window on both sides. The face is also whitish-gray as are those of the engines and much of the rolling stock, as opposed to the same brown as her paintwork as she appears in the book.

Voice actors
 Maggie Ollerenshaw (Season 18 onwards)
 TBA (Thomas & Friends: The Movie)
 Yumi Nakatani (Japan (Season 1 only))
 Keiko Nemoto (Japan (Season 18 onwards))

Toby also has a baggage car named Elsie, mentioned in The Island of Sodor: Its People, History and Railways and the 1979 Thomas the Tank Engine Annual. However, she did not appear in any stories in The Railway Series or Thomas & Friends. According to the Rev. W. Awdry, she is based upon a Wisbech and Upwell Tramway luggage van and shares a shed with Henrietta.

Heritage railways

There are no surviving J70 trams; however, there is a replica based at the East Anglian Railway Museum, albeit it is a diesel-hydraulic 0-4-0 shunter with a metal casing over it. When this diesel was converted a replica Henrietta was built from scratch. The underframe was taken from an old box van, but the body was a complete new build. Toby and Henrietta can be seen running on the Museum's Day out with Thomas events.

A project to build a steam-powered replica of a GER Class G15 Wisbech and Upwell tram based on a Belgian Cockerill 0-4-0 tram engine has been underway for some time at the Nene Valley Railway. Named "Toby", work on the project stalled following the deaths of the tram's owners, but the project was sold in January 2011 with a view to recommencing work on the replica.

A project to build a J70 replica to resemble a tram engine based on the 'Wisbech and Upwell Tram Railway's "Toby the Tram Engine" is under way at Mangapps Railway Museum near Burnham on Crouch in Essex. The engine is a Drewry – Vulcan industrial diesel locomotive '11104'.

Notes

References

External links
A fansite page on Toby the Tram Engine.
The Real Lives of Thomas the Tank Engine page on Toby.
The Real Lives of Thomas the Tank Engine page on Henrietta and Elsie. This section also includes a link to the article on Toby from Railway Modeller.

The Railway Series characters
Thomas & Friends characters
Fictional locomotives
Literary characters introduced in 1952